The Luzon Strait (Tagalog: Kipot ng Luzon) is the strait between Taiwan and Luzon island of the Philippines.  The strait thereby connects the Philippine Sea to the South China Sea in the western Pacific Ocean.

This body of water is an important strait for shipping and communications. Many ships from the Americas use this route to go to important East Asian ports. Many submarine communications cables pass through the Luzon Strait. These cables provide important data and telephony services to mainland China, Hong Kong, Taiwan, Japan and South Korea.

Description 
The strait is divided into a number of smaller channels. The Babuyan Channel separates Luzon from the Babuyan Islands, which is separated from Batanes by the Balintang Channel. Batanes is separated from Taiwan by the Bashi Channel.

Some of the largest ocean waves in the world, at times over 170 meters in height and stemming from tides and ocean currents, are found in the north of the strait. These waves or currents are underwater and rarely break the surface, thus posing no danger to shipping but are sometimes visible to satellites.  The oscillation is largely prompted by a long north–south ridge which covers almost all of the strait, then amplified in the northern section by a second parallel ridge.  The depth of the strait reaches the 3,500 m and 4,000 contours in north–south trenches in the middle and south-western edge.

History 

The Luzon Strait was part of the Japanese invasion route during the Second World War. On December 8, 1941 (the same day as the Japanese attack on Pearl Harbor, due to the International Date Line), forces of the Empire of Japan landed on Batanes. By December 10, they had occupied Camiguin de Babuyanes in the Babuyan Islands (not to be confused with the island-province of Camiguin off northern Mindanao) in a soon-abandoned attempt to establish a seaplane base, and on the same day landed at Aparri, Cagayan on Luzon.

Subsequently, during the Second World War, many US submarines hunted Japanese convoys passing through the strait on their way from the East Indies to Japan.

References

Straits of the Philippines
Straits of the South China Sea
Borders of the Philippines
Straits of Taiwan
International straits
Borders of the Republic of China